The Airline Belle or Air-line Belle was a steam passenger train running between Atlanta and Toccoa, Georgia, on the Atlanta and Charlotte Air Line Railway (later the Southern Railway) between 1879 and 1931.

39 stops 

Terminal Station (Atlanta)
Easton, a settlement located in today's Ansley Park neighborhood of Atlanta
Armour Station, mile 6.1
Ottley, mile 9.8
Goodwin's Crossing (or "Goodwin's" or "Goodwin Station"), in today's Brookhaven area, mile 11
Roswell Junction, mile 13
Doraville, mile 15
Chamblee
Norcross, mile 19
Duluth, mile 25
Suwanee, mile 31
Buford, mile 38
Flowery Branch, mile 44
Odell's, mile 47
Gainesville, mile 53
White Sulphur Springs, mile 60
Lula, mile 65
Bellton, mile 66
Rabun Cap Junction, mile 78
Mt. Airy, mile 80
Ayersville, mile 86
Carolina
Mechanicsville (Gwinnett County)
Beaver Dam
Carolina
Sugar Hill
Oakwood
Cagle
Raoul
New Switzerland
Alto
Toccoa, mile 93

References

 "The Airline Belle Makes Final Run in North Georgia", Atlanta Journal, July 26, 1931
 Atlanta and Environs: A Chronicle of Its People and Events, 1880s-1930s, by Franklin M. Garrett.
 Living Atlanta: An Oral History of the City, 1914-1948, by Clifford M. Kuhn. 
 Vardeman, Johnny. "Riders loved to commute on Airline Belle rail line". Gainesville Times, September 2, 2012.

Named passenger trains of the United States
Passenger trains of the Southern Railway (U.S.)
Passenger rail transportation in Georgia (U.S. state)
Railway services introduced in 1879
Railway services discontinued in 1931